Rahim Yar Khan zoo is a Zoo located in Rahim Yar Khan, Punjab, Pakistan.

References

Wildlife parks in Pakistan
Tourist attractions in Rahim Yar Khan